Apostasy in Christianity is the repudiation of Christ and the central teachings of Christianity by someone who formerly was a Christian (Christ-follower). The term apostasy comes from the Greek word apostasia ("ἀποστασία") meaning "rebellion", "state of apostasy", "abandonment", or "defection". It has been described as "a willful falling away from, or rebellion against, Christianity. Apostasy is the rejection of Christ by one who has been a Christian...." "Apostasy is a theological category describing those who have voluntarily and consciously abandoned their faith in the God of the covenant, who manifests himself most completely in Jesus Christ." "Apostasy is the antonym of conversion; it is deconversion."

B. J. Oropeza, who has written one of the most exhaustive studies on the phenomenon of apostasy in the New Testament (3 Volumes, 793 pages), "uncovered several factors that result in apostasy." Some of these factors overlap, and some Christian communities were "susceptible to more than one of these." The first major factor in a believer committing apostasy (i.e., becoming an unbeliever) is "unbelief." Other factors potentially leading to apostasy include: "persecution," "general suffering and hardship," "false teachings and factions," "malaise," "indifference and negligence towards the things of God" (specifically, "the command to love one's neighbors"), and engaging in sinful acts ("vice-doing") or assimilating to the ungodly attitudes and actions reflected in a non-Christian culture.

Biblical teaching
For additional biblical teaching on the possibility of apostasy see

The Greek noun apostasia (rebellion, abandonment, state of apostasy, defection) is found only twice in the New Testament (Acts ; 2 Thessalonians ). However, "the concept of apostasy is found throughout Scripture." The related verb aphistēmi (go away, withdraw, depart, fall away) carries considerable theological significance in three passages (Luke 8:13; 1 Timothy 4:1; Hebrews 3:12).

In The New International Dictionary of New Testament Theology, Wolfgang Bauder writes:

1 Timothy 4:1 describes "falling away from the faith" in the last days in terms of falling into false, heretical beliefs. Lk. 8:13 probably refers to apostasy as a result of eschatological temptation. Here are people who have come to believe, who have received the gospel "with joy." But under the pressure of persecution and tribulation arising because of the faith, they break off the relationship with God into which they have entered. According to Hebrews 3:12, apostasy consists in an unbelieving and self-willed movement away from God (in contrast to Hebrews 3:14), which must be prevented at all costs. aphistēmi thus connotes in the passages just mentioned the serious situation of becoming separated from the living God after a previous turning towards him, by falling away from the faith. It is a movement of unbelief and sin, which can also be expressed by other words (cf. the par. to Luke 8:13 in Matthew 13:21; Mark 4:17; . . .). Expressions equivalent in meaning to the warning in 1 Timothy 4:1 include nauageō, suffer shipwreck, 1:19; astocheō miss the mark, 1:6; 6:21; 2 Timothy 2:18; cf. also aperchomai, go away, John 6:66; apostrephō, turn away; arneomai, deny; metatithēmi, change, alter; mē menein, do not abide, John 15:6; . . .  [see also] the pictures of defection in Matthew 24:9–12, and Revelation 13."

Wolfgang Bauder goes on add that piptō, fall (1 Corinthians 10:12; Hebrews 4:11), and ekpiptō, fall off or from (Galatians 5:4; 2 Peter 3:17), is used figuratively in the New Testament to refer to "the consequent loss of salvation, rather than of a mere failure from which recovery can be made. It is a catastrophic fall, which means eternal ruin. If it were not so, all the warnings against falling would lose their threatening urgency. To fall into sin and guilt, as an expression of a total attitude, is to plunge into irrevocable misfortune."

The following passages where the verb skandalizō ("fall away from faith") and the noun skandalon ("enticement to unbelief, cause of salvation's loss, seduction"): are theologically important as well:

Heinz Giesen, in the Exegetical Dictionary of the New Testament, writes:

In the passive voice σκανδαλίζω [skandalizō] more often means . . . "fall away from faith." In the interpretation of the parable of the sower (Mark 4:13-20 par. Matt 13:18-23) those identified with the seeds sown on rocky ground, i.e., those "with no root in themselves," the inconstant
ones, go astray to their own ruin when persecuted on account of the word, i.e., they fall away from faith (Mark 4:17 par. Matt 13:21). The Lukan parallel reads appropriately ἀφίστημι [aphistēmi, fall away] (8:13). In Matt 24:10 Jesus predicts that in the end time many will fall away [skandalizō]. The result is that they will hate one another, wickedness will be multiplied, and love will grow cold. Yet whoever endures in love until the end will be saved (vv. 11, 13).
. . . In the Johannine farewell address (John 16:1) σκανδαλίζω [skandalizō] does not only imply an "endangering of faith" . . . but rather "falling away from faith" entirely, from which the disciples and Christians are to be kept. . . . In the active voice σκανδαλίζω [skandalizō] means "cause someone to fall away from (or reject) faith," as in the saying of Jesus about the person who "causes one of these little ones who believe in me to sin [stumble]" (Mark 9:42 par. Matt 18:6/Luke 17:2). The Christian is enjoined to reject anything that might be an obstacle to faith, as emphasized in Mark 9:43,45,47 in metaphorical, hyperbolic language: Hand, foot, and eye--in Jewish understanding the loci of lust or sinful desires--must be given up if they threaten to become the cause of loss of faith and thus of salvation. This . . . underscores the seriousness of conviction within which one must persevere if one wishes to enter (eternal) life or the kingdom of God. . . . Matt 5:29, 30 also issues an exhortation to decisive action [cf. Matt 18:8, 9]. . . . According to 1 Cor 8:9 a Christian's freedom regarding eating food offered to idols reaches its limit when it becomes a stumbling block to one's brother (πρόσκομμα [proskomma]). Hence Paul emphasizes that he will never again eat meat if by doing so he causes his brother to fall and thus to lose salvation (σκανδαλίζω [skandalizō], v. 13a, b), since otherwise that weaker brother is destroyed by the knowledge of the "stronger" (v. 11). Whoever sins against his brothers sins also against Christ (v. 12). . . . Within the context of the protection of the "little ones" in the Church, i.e., probably the "weak ones" ([Matthew] 18:6-10), Jesus utters an eschatological threat ("woe!") against the world (alienated from God) because of temptations to sin (v. 7a); though he allows that such temptations must come (v. 7b), he finally hurls an eschatological "woe!" against the person by whom the temptation comes (v. 7c). σκάνδαλον [skandalon] used here of the temptation to fall away from faith. The parallel, Luke 17:1, like Matt 18:7b, also underscores that such temptations are unavoidable; nonetheless, the person by whom they come receives the eschatological "woe!" that already places him under divine judgment. . . . In Rom 14:13 Paul admonishes the "strong," whose position he fundamentally shares (v. 14), not to cause the "weak" any stumbling block to faith through eating habits . . . . In Rom 16:17 the σκάνδαλον [skandalon] are the various satanic activities of the false teachers who endanger the salvation of Church members, who are being seduced into falling away from correct teaching; such teachers also threaten both the unity and very existence of the Church. Similarly, in Rev 2:14 σκάνδαλον [skandalon] refers to a stumbling block to faith in the context of false teaching. According to 1 John 2:10 there is no cause for stumbling or sin in a believer who loves his brother . . . i.e., no cause for unbelief and thus a loss of salvation.

Paul Barnett notes that James warns his readers of the possibility of temptation leading to apostasy. While a person is not tempted by God to sin, they can be "lured and enticed by his own desires" to sin (James 1:13–15). He adds, "This letter has in mind a 'way' (hodos, James 5:20) of belief and behavior, from which one may be "led astray" (planasthe, James 1:16; i.e., by the influence of others) or 'stray from' (planēthē, James 5:19; i.e., by one's own decision). Either way the one who is away from the true path is in jeopardy in regard to his or her personal salvation (James 5:20)."

Barnett also mentions that "2 Peter addresses the grim situation of apostasy expressed by immorality (2 Peter 2:2–3, 14-16), under the influence of false teachers who have 'denied the master who bought them' (2 Peter 2:1, 17-22)." Furthermore, in the book of Revelation:

It is clear that the churches of Asia are subject to persecution and its accompanying pressure to apostatize that arise from a Jewish quarter in Smyrna and Philadelphia (Revelation 2:9) and from the emperor cult in Pergamum (Revelation 2:13). At the same time various false teachings are touching the churches of Ephesus (Revelation 2:6), Pergamum (Revelation 2:14–15) and Thyatira (Revelation 2:20). The language of "deception," that is, of being "led astray," is applied to the false prophetess, Jezebel (Revelation 2:20). Satan, the source of all these persecution and false teachings, is also "the deceiver of the whole world" (Revelation 12:9). The metaphor, "deception" (planaō), implies a path of truth from which one might be "turned aside." Against these Satan-inspired obstacles the reader are called upon to "conquer," that is, to overcome these problems.

Apostasy in the Letter to the Hebrews

The Epistle to the Hebrews is the classic text on the subject of apostasy in the New Testament. New Testament scholar Scot McKnight argues that the warning passages (2:1–4; 3:7–4:13; 5:11–6:12; 10:19–39; 12:1–29) should be read and interpreted "as an organic whole, each of which expresses four components of the author’s message." These four components are "(1) the subjects or audience in danger of committing the sin, (2) the sin that leads to (3) the exhortation, which if not followed, leads to (4) the consequences of that sin." McKnight concluded from his study that (1) the subjects of this letter were genuine "believers, persons who . . . had converted to Jesus Christ,” (2) The sin "is apostasy, a deliberate and public act of deconfessing Jesus Christ, a rejection of God's Spirit, and a refusal to submit to God and His will," (3) the exhortation is "to a persevering faithfulness to God and his revelation of the new covenant in Jesus Christ," (4) the consequences involve "eternal damnation if a person does not persevere in the faith." B. J. Oropeza concludes that apostasy threatens the community in Hebrews on two fronts: mistreatment by outsiders (persecution) and malaise involving reluctance to listen to godly exhortation.

Imagery of Apostasy in the Bible

The Dictionary of Biblical Imagery states that "There are at least four distinct images in Scripture of the concept of apostasy. All connote an intentional defection from the faith." These images are: Rebellion; Turning Away; Falling Away; Adultery.

Rebellion

"In classical literature apostasia was used to denote a coup or defection. By extension, the Septuagint (the Greek translation of the Old Testament) always uses this word to portray a rebellion against God."

Turning away

"Apostasy is also pictured as the heart turning away from God (Jeremiah 17:5–6) and righteousness (Ezekiel 3:20). In the OT it centers on Israel's breaking covenant relationship with God through disobedience to the law (Jeremiah 2:19), especially following other gods (Judges 2:19) and practicing their immorality (Daniel 9:9–11). . . . Following the Lord or journeying with him is one of the chief images of faithfulness in the Scriptures. . . . The . . . Hebrew root (swr) is used to picture those who have turned away and ceased to follow God ('I am grieved that I have made Saul king, because he has turned away from me,' 1 Samuel 15:11). . . . The image of turning away from the Lord, who is the rightful leader, and following behind false gods is the dominant image for apostasy in the Old Testament."

Falling away

"The image of falling, with the sense of going to eternal destruction, is particularly evident in the New Testament. . . . In his [Christ’s] parable of the wise and foolish builder, in which the house built on sand falls with a crash in the midst of a storm (Matthew 7:24–27) . . . he painted a highly memorable image of the dangers of falling spiritually."

Adultery

One of the most common images for apostasy in the Old Testament is adultery. "Apostasy is symbolized as Israel the faithless spouse turning away from Yahweh her marriage partner to pursue the advances of other gods (Jeremiah 2:1–3; Ezekiel 16). . . . 'Your children have forsaken me and sworn by god that are not gods. I supplied all their needs, yet they committed adultery and thronged to the houses of prostitutes' (Jeremiah 5:7, NIV). Adultery is used most often to graphically name the horror of the betrayal and covenant breaking involved in idolatry. Like literal adultery it does include the idea of someone blinded by infatuation, in this case for an idol: 'How I have been grieved by their adulterous hearts . . . which have lusted after their idols' (Ezekiel 6:9)."

Other images

A variety of colorful images are used to describe Israel's apostasy: "a rebellious ox, a prostitute, a wild vine, a stain that will not wash off, a camel in heat and a thief caught in thievery (Jeremiah 2:19-28)." Images of peril attend apostasy, for to have forsaken God is to come under his judgment (Exodus 22:20; Deuteronomy 6:14–15; 17:2–7). "The New Testament contains a host of images of apostasy, including a plant taking root among the rocks but withering under the hot sun of testing (Mark 4:5–6, 17 par.), or those who fall prey to the wiles of false teachers (Matthew 24:11), heretical beliefs (1 Timothy 4:1; 2 Timothy 4:3–4), worldliness and its defilement (2 Peter 2:20–22), and persecution (Matthew 24:9–10; Revelation 3:8). The Christian apostate is pictured as a branch that does not abide in the vine of Christ and thus withers and is cast into the fire (John 15:6). Animal behavior is evoked in a dog returning to its vomit or a clean pig returning to the mire (2 Peter 2:22)."

Views of the early church fathers

Paul Barnett says, "Believers in the era following that of the apostles probably suffered a greater intensity to turn aside from Christ than did their predecessors. They ... were vulnerable to Jewish reprisals as well as action from the state. Details of the pressure applied to Christians to apostatize is given from both Christian and non-Christian sources ... It is understandable, therefore, that the postapostolic literature should contain many warnings not to apostatize." 

According to B. J. Oropeza, the warning passages in the New Testament describe at least three basic dangers which could lead a Christian to apostatize from Christ and the Christian faith:
Temptations: Christians were tempted to engage in various vices that were a part of their lives before they became Christians (idolatry, sexual immorality, covetousness, etc.).
Deceptions: Christians encountered various heresies and false teachings spread by false teachers and prophets that threatened to seduce them away from their pure devotion to Christ.
Persecutions: Christians were persecuted by the governing powers of the day for their allegiance to Christ. Many Christians were threatened with certain death if they would not deny Christ.
Persecution  is highlighted in the Epistle to the Hebrews and the First Epistle of Peter. The issue of false teachers/teachings is found in the Johannine and Pauline epistles, in the Second Epistle of Peter and the Epistle of Jude. A number of sections in the writings of Paul and James focus on vices and virtues. "These and other early texts helped to shape the trajectory of Christian response to the phenomenon of defection in the post-apostolic era. The Christians were to persevere through various types of opposition, standing firm against temptation, false doctrine, hardships and persecution."

The following translation from various early Christian writers is provided by Alexander Roberts and James Donaldson in the Ante-Nicene Fathers.

Temptations: avoid vices and practice virtues

Clement of Rome (c. 96) writes to the Corinthian congregation whose unity has been threatened because a "few rash and self-confident persons" have kindled shameful and detestable seditions towards the established leaders (presbyters) in the congregation (1 Clement 1). This jealous rivalry and envy has caused righteousness and peace to depart from the community (1 Clement 3). The writer laments: "Every one abandons the fear of God, and is become blind in His faith, neither walks in the ordinances of His appointment, nor acts a part becoming a Christian, but walks after his own wicked lusts, resuming the practice of an unrighteous and ungodly envy, by which death itself entered into the world." (1 Clement 3) Since history has demonstrated that many evils have flowed from envy and jealousy (1 Clement 4-6), the Corinthians are exhorted to repent (1 Clement 7-8), yield obedience to God's "glorious will," and to "forsake all fruitless labors and strife, and envy, which leads to death" (1 Clement 9:1). Furthermore, they are to "be of humble mind, laying aside all haughtiness, and pride, and foolishness, and angry feelings" (1 Clement 13), and "to obey God rather than to follow those who, through pride and sedition, have become the leaders of a detestable emulation [jealous rivalry]" (1 Clement 14). He then warns, "For we shall incur no slight injury, but rather great danger, if we rashly yield ourselves to the inclinations of men who aim at exciting strife and tumults, so as to draw us away from what is good" (1 Clement 14; cf. 47). Clement bids his readers to cleave "to those who cultivate peace with godliness" (1 Clement 15), and to follow the humility and submission that Christ and other saints practiced (1 Clement 16-19), which brings peace and harmony with others (1 Clement 19-20). Clement then gives these exhortations and warnings:
Take heed, beloved, lest His many kindnesses lead to the condemnation of us all. [For thus it must be] unless we walk worthy of Him, and with one mind do those things which are good and well-pleasing in His sight. (1 Clement 21)
Since then all things are seen and heard [by God], let us fear Him, and forsake those wicked works which proceed from evil desires; so that, through His mercy, we may be protected from the judgments to come. For whither can any of us flee from His mighty hand? Or what world will receive any of those who run away from Him? (1 Clement 28)
Let us therefore earnestly strive to be found in the number of those who wait for Him, in order that we may share in His promised gifts. But how, beloved, shall this be done? If our understanding be fixed by faith towards God; if we earnestly seek the things which are pleasing and acceptable to Him; if we do the things which are in harmony with His blameless will; and if we follow the way of truth, casting away from us all unrighteousness and iniquity, along with all covetousness, strife, evil practices, deceit, whispering, and evil-speaking, all hatred of God, pride and haughtiness, vainglory and ambition. For they that do such things are hateful to God; and not only they that do them, but also those who take pleasure in those who do them. (1 Clement 35)
Why are there strifes, and tumults, and divisions, and schisms, and wars among you? Have we not [all] one God and one Christ? Is there not one Spirit of grace poured out upon us? And have we not one calling in Christ? Why do we divide and tear to pieces the members of Christ, and raise up strife against our own body, and have reached such a height of madness as to forget that "we are members one of another?" Remember the words of our Lord Jesus Christ, how He said, "Woe to that man [by whom offences come]! It were better for him that he had never been born, than that he should cast a stumbling-block before one of my elect. Yea, it were better for him that a millstone should be hung about [his neck], and he should be sunk in the depths of the sea, than that he should cast a stumbling-block before one of my little ones." Your schism has subverted [the faith of] many, has discouraged many, has given rise to doubt in many, and has caused grief to us all. And still your sedition continues. (1 Clement 46)

Those responsible for laying the foundation of this sedition are urged to submit to the presbyters, repent, and to lay aside their pride and arrogance. For it is better that they occupy a humble place in the flock of Christ, than being highly exalted and ultimately "cast out from the hope of His people" (1 Clement 57).

Similar to Clement, Ignatius of Antioch (c. 107) warns believers about following a schismatic person:
Keep yourselves from those evil plants which Jesus Christ does not tend, because they are not the planting of the Father. Not that I have found any division among you, but exceeding purity. For as many as are of God and of Jesus Christ are also with the bishop. And as many as shall, in the exercise of repentance, return into the unity of the Church, these, too, shall belong to God, that they may live according to Jesus Christ. Do not err, my brethren. If any man follows him that makes a schism in the Church, he shall not inherit the kingdom of God. (Epistle of the Philadelphians 3) 

The author of the epistle of Barnabas (c. 100) both admonishes and warns his readers about coming dangers:
Since, therefore, the days are evil, and Satan possesses the power of this world, we ought to give heed to ourselves, and diligently inquire into the ordinances of the Lord. Fear and patience, then, are helpers of our faith; and long-suffering and continence are things which fight on our side. . . . We ought therefore, brethren, carefully to inquire concerning our salvation, lest the wicked one, having made his entrance by deceit, should hurl us forth from our [true] life. (Barnabas 2:1–2, 10).
Let us then utterly flee from all the works of iniquity, lest these should take hold of us; and let us hate the error of the present time, that we may set our love on the world to come: let us not give loose reins to our soul, that it should have power to run with sinners and the wicked, lest we become like them. (Barnabas 4:1–2)
We take earnest heed in these last days; for the whole [past] time of your faith will profit you nothing, unless now in this wicked time we also withstand coming sources of danger, as becomes the sons of God. That the Black One may find no means of entrance, let us flee from every vanity, let us utterly hate the works of the way of wickedness. . . . (Barnabas 4:9–10)
Let us be spiritually-minded: let us be a perfect temple to God. As much as in us lies, let us meditate upon the fear of God, and let us keep His commandments, that we may rejoice in His ordinances. The Lord will judge the world without respect of persons. Each will receive as he has done: if he is righteous, his righteousness will precede him; if he is wicked, the reward of wickedness is before him. Take heed, lest resting at our ease, as those who are the called [of God], we should fall asleep in our sins, and the wicked prince, acquiring power over us, should thrust us away from the kingdom of the Lord. (Barnabas 4:11–13)
In the last chapters of the epistle of Barnabas (18-21), the author sets two ways before Christians which are described in the metaphors of light and darkness (referring to abstaining from or the practicing of vices). Those who walk in the light "will be glorified in the kingdom of heaven" (Barnabas 21:1), and will be "safe in the day of judgment" (Barnabas 21:6). While those who walk in darkness will experience "eternal death with punishment" (Barnabas 20:1), and will be "destroyed with their works" (Barnabas 21:1).
"The Didache (c. 100) also maintains two ways: the way of life or death. The way of life is associated with loving God and one's neighbor. It involves abstaining from vices mentioned in the Ten Commandments or related to bodily lusts, sorcery, and idolatry (including meat sacrificed to idols). The way of death includes the practices of these vices (Didache 1-6).”

In Polycarp's epistle to the Philippians (2nd century) the vice of covetousness is a significant danger. Presbyters are advised to be "keeping far off from all covetousness" (Philippians 6). Polycarp expresses his grief over a former presbyter Valens and his wife who apparently committed some act of covetousness. He hopes that the Lord will grant them repentance. He enjoins his readers to "abstain from covetousness," and "every form of evil," and goes on to give this warning, "If a man does not keep himself from covetousness, he shall be defiled by idolatry, and shall be judged as one of the heathen" (Philippians 11). Polycarp says believers "ought to walk worthy of His commandments and glory," and that deacons are to be blameless, not slanderers or lovers of money, but temperate in all things, "walking according to the truth of the Lord" (Philippians 5). He then adds:
If we please Him in this present world, we shall receive also the future world, according as He has promised to us that He will raise us again from the dead, and that if we live worthily of Him, "we shall also reign together with Him," provided only we believe. In like manner, let the young men also be blameless in all things, being especially careful to preserve purity, and keeping themselves in, as with a bridle, from every kind of evil. For it is well that they should be cut off from the lusts that are in the world, since "every lust wars against the spirit;" [1 Peter 2:11] and "neither fornicators, nor effeminate, nor abusers of themselves with mankind, shall inherit the kingdom of God," [1 Corinthians 6:9–10] nor those who do things inconsistent and unbecoming. Wherefore, it is needful to abstain from all these things, being subject to the presbyters and deacons, as unto God and Christ. (Philippians 5)
In an ancient sermon (c. 150) the author exhorts his audience to pursue righteousness and abstain from vices:
Let us, then, not only call Him Lord, for that will not save us. For He saith, "Not everyone that saith to me, Lord, Lord, shall be saved, but he that worketh righteousness." Wherefore, brethren, let us confess Him by our works, by loving one another, by not committing adultery, or speaking evil of one another, or cherishing envy; but by being continent, compassionate, and good. We ought also to sympathize with one another, and not be avaricious. By such works let us confess Him, and not by those that are of an opposite kind. And it is not fitting that we should fear men, but rather God. For this reason, if we should do such [wicked] things, the Lord hath said, "Even though ye were gathered together to me in my very bosom, yet if ye were not to keep my commandments, I would cast you off, and say unto you, Depart from me; I know you not whence ye are, ye workers of iniquity." (2 Clement 4)
The author further summons his readers to "do the will of Him that called us," (2 Clement 5) and to consider
that the sojourning in the flesh in this world is but brief and transient, but the promise of Christ is great and wonderful, even the rest of the kingdom to come, and of life everlasting. By what course of conduct, then, shall we attain these things, but by leading a holy and righteous life, and by deeming these worldly things as not belonging to us, and not fixing our desires upon them? For if we desire to possess them, we fall away from the path of righteousness. (2 Clement 5)
The writer goes on to say that this present world (which urges one to "adultery and corruption, avarice and deceit"), is an enemy to the world to come (which "bids farewell to these things"), and thus, we cannot "be the friends of both" (2 Clement 6). Therefore,
Let us reckon that it is better to hate the things present, since they are trifling, and transient, and corruptible; and to love those [which are to come,] as being good and incorruptible. For if we do the will of Christ, we shall find rest; otherwise, nothing shall deliver us from eternal punishment, if we disobey His commandments. . . . How can we hope to enter into the royal residence of God unless we keep our baptism holy and undefiled? Or who shall be our advocate, unless we be found possessed of works of holiness and righteousness? (2 Clement 6)
Let us also, while we are in this world, repent with our whole heart of the evil deeds we have done in the flesh, that we may be saved by the Lord, while we have yet an opportunity of repentance. For after we have gone out of the world, no further power of confessing or repenting will there belong to us. Wherefore, brethren, by doing the will of the Father, and keeping the flesh holy, and observing the commandments of the Lord, we shall obtain eternal life. (2 Clement 8)
B. J. Oropeza writes:
If the warning against vices and the call to repentance marks a facet of apostasy in patristic writings of the late first and early second centuries, the Shepherd of Hermas epitomizes this aspect. Those who have sinned grievously and committed apostasy are beckoned to return. Falling away and repentance are portrayed in complex ways, and this perhaps complements the multifaceted nature of earliest Christian discourses on the issue. Contrary to the book of Hebrews, which seems to teach that baptized Christians are not given a second chance once they fall away (cf. Hebrews 6:4–6; 10:26–31), the Shepherd of Hermas affirms that apostates may be forgiven while a gap of time remains before the final eschaton. A refusal to respond to this offer will result in final condemnation. Those who have denied the Lord in the past are given a second chance, but those who deny him in the coming tribulation will be rejected "from their life" (Her. Vis. 2.2).
In the vision of the tower under construction (the church), numerous stones (believers) are gathered for the building. Among the rejected are those who are not genuine Christians; they received their faith in hypocrisy. Others do not remain in the truth, and others who go astray are finally burned in fire (Vis. 3.6–7). Some others are novices who turn away before they are baptized, and still others fall away due to hardships, being led astray by their riches. They may become useful stones, however, if they are separated from their riches. The penitents receive 12 commands; salvific life depends on their observance (Her. Man. 12.3–6). Repentance would become unprofitable for the Christian who falls again after restoration (Man. 4.1:8; 3:6).
In the Parables, rods of various shapes and sizes represent different kinds of believers: the faithful, rich, double-minded, doubtful-minded, and hypocritical deceivers. These are allowed to repent – if they do not, they will lose eternal life (Her. Sim. 8.6–11). Apostates and traitors who blaspheme the Lord by their sins are completely destroyed (Sim. 8.6:4). Another parable describes apostates as certain stones which are cast away from the house of God and delivered to women who represent 12 vices. They may enter the house again if they follow virgins who represent 12 virtues. Certain apostates became worse than they were before they believed and will suffer eternal death even though they had fully known God. Nevertheless, most people, whether apostates or fallen ministers, have an opportunity to repent and be restored (Sim. 9.13–15, 18ff). Hermas and his audience are to persevere and practice repentance if they wish to partake of life (Sim. 10.2–4).

Irenaeus of Lyons (c. 180) recounts how God has recorded the sins of men of old (David and Solomon)
for our instruction . . . that we might know, in the first place, that our God and theirs is one, and that sins do not please Him although committed by men of renown; and in the second place, that we should keep from wickedness. For if these men of old time, who preceded us in the gifts [bestowed upon them], and for whom the Son of God had not yet suffered, when they committed any sin and served fleshly lusts, were rendered objects of such disgrace, what shall the men of the present day suffer, who have despised the Lord’s coming, and become the slaves of their own lusts? And truly the death of the Lord became [the means of] healing and remission of sins to the former, but Christ shall not die again in behalf of those who now commit sin, for death shall no more have dominion over Him. . . . We ought not, therefore, as that presbyter remarks, to be puffed up, nor be severe upon those of old time, but ought ourselves to fear, lest perchance, after [we have come to] the knowledge of Christ, if we do things displeasing to God, we obtain no further forgiveness of sins, but be shut out from His kingdom. And therefore it was that Paul said, "For if [God] spared not the natural branches, [take heed] lest He also spare not thee" [Romans 11:21]. . . . (Against Heresies, Book 4:27.2)
Irenaeus proceeds to quote from 1 Corinthians 10:1–12, where Israel fell under the judgment of God for craving evil things, and then comments:
As then the unrighteous, the idolaters, and fornicators perished, so also is it now: for both the Lord declares, that such persons are sent into eternal fire; and the apostle says, "Know ye not that the unrighteous shall not inherit the kingdom of God? Be not deceived: neither fornicators, nor idolaters, nor adulterers, not effeminate, nor abusers of themselves with mankind, nor thieves, nor covetous, nor drunkards, nor revilers, nor extortioners, shall inherit the kingdom of God." [1 Corinthians 6:9–10] And as it was not to those who are without that he said these things, but to us—lest we should be cast forth from the kingdom of God, by doing any such thing. . . . And again does the apostle say, "Let no man deceive you with vain words; for because of these things cometh the wrath of God upon the sons of mistrust. Be not ye therefore partakers with them." [Ephesians 5:6–7] (Against Heresies, Book 4:27.4)

Deceptions: watch out for false teachers and heresies

The "early Christians frequently believed that apostasy came by way of deceivers at the instigation of the devil, and terrible consequences awaited such people." The writings of Ignatius have several warnings about being on guard against false teachers and the heresy they disseminate. In the letter to the Christians at Ephesus, Ignatius is happy to report that "all live according to the truth, and that no sect has any dwelling-place among you. Nor, indeed, do you hearken to any one rather than to Jesus Christ speaking in truth" (Epistle to the Ephesians 6). He mentions that there are false teachers who "are in the habit of carrying about the name [of Jesus Christ] in wicked guile, while yet they practice things unworthy of God, whom you must flee as you would wild beasts. For they are ravening dogs, who bite secretly, against whom you must be on your guard" (Epistle to the Ephesians 7). The readers are further admonished to "Let not then any one deceive you" (Epistle to the Ephesians 8), and commended because "you did not allow [false teachers] to sow among you, but stopped your ears, that you might not receive those things [i.e., false doctrines] which were sown by them" (Epistle to the Ephesians 9). Ignatius then gives this solemn warning:
Do not err, my brethren. Those that corrupt families shall not inherit the kingdom of God. If, then, those who do this as respects the flesh have suffered death, how much more shall this be the case with any one who corrupts by wicked doctrine the faith of God, for which Jesus Christ was crucified! Such a one becoming defiled [in this way], shall go away into everlasting fire, and so shall every one that hearkens unto him. . . . Be not anointed with the bad odor of the doctrine of the prince of this world; let him not lead you away captive from the life which is set before you. And why are we not all prudent, since we have received the knowledge of God, which is Jesus Christ? Why do we foolishly perish, not recognizing the gift which the Lord has of a truth sent to us? (Epistle to the Ephesians 16-17)

In the letter to the Magnesians, Ignatius admonishes his readers, "Be not deceived with strange doctrines, nor with old fables, which are unprofitable" (Epistle to Magnesians 8). Later he writes: "I desire to guard you beforehand, that you fall not upon the hooks of vain doctrine, but that you attain to full assurance in regard to the birth, and passion, and resurrection which took place in the time of the government of Pontius Pilate, being truly and certainly accomplished by Jesus Christ, who is our hope, from which may no one of you ever be turned aside" (Epistle to Magnesians 11). In yet another letter, Ignatius entreats his readers to
use Christian nourishment only, and abstain from herbage of a different kind; I mean heresy. For those [that are given to this] mix up Jesus Christ with their own poison, speaking things which are unworthy of credit, like those who administer a deadly drug in sweet wine, which he who is ignorant of does greedily take, with a fatal pleasure leading to his own death. Be on your guard, therefore, against such persons. (Epistle to the Trallians 6-7)
Furthermore:
Stop your ears, therefore, when any one speaks to you at variance with Jesus Christ, who was descended from David, and was also of Mary; who was truly born, and ate and drank. He was truly persecuted under Pontius Pilate; He was truly crucified, and [truly] died, in the sight of beings in heaven, and on earth, and under the earth. He was also truly raised from the dead, His Father quickening Him, even as after the same manner His Father will so raise up us who believe in Him by Christ Jesus, apart from whom we do not possess the true life. (Epistle to the Trallians 9)
"The final section of the Didache echoes the Synoptic tradition (Matthew 24:4–13, 15, 21–26; Mark 13:5ff; Luke 21:8ff; cf. 2 Thessalonians 2:3ff; Revelation 13:13–14) when it warns against apostasy through the deception of false prophets in the last days:"
Watch for your life's sake. Let not your lamps be quenched, nor your loins unloosed; but be ready, for you know not the hour in which our Lord comes. But often shall you come together, seeking the things which are befitting to your souls: for the whole time of your faith will not profit you, if you be not made perfect in the last time. For in the last days false prophets and corrupters shall be multiplied, and the sheep shall be turned into wolves, and love shall be turned into hate; for when lawlessness increases, they shall hate and persecute and betray one another, and then shall appear the world-deceiver as the Son of God, and shall do signs and wonders, and the earth shall be delivered into his hands, and he shall do iniquitous things which have never yet come to pass since the beginning. Then shall the creation of men come into the fire of trial, and many shall be made to stumble and shall perish; but they that endure in their faith shall be saved from under the curse itself. (Didache 16)
Tertullian argues that believers ought not to be surprised or alarmed at the existence of heresies since Christ and his apostles told us beforehand that they would arise and gave, "in anticipation, warnings to avoid them" (Prescription Against Heretics 4, cf. 1). Neither should believers be surprised that heresies "subvert the faith of some" (Prescription Against Heretics 1). Heresies are a trial to faith, giving faith the opportunity to be approved (Prescriptions Against Heretics 1). While heresies "are produced for the weakening and the extinction of faith," they have "no strength whenever they encounter a really powerful faith" (Prescriptions Against Heretics 2). According to Tertullian, heresy is whatever contradicts the "rule of faith" which he defends as
the belief that there is one only God, and that He is none other than the Creator of the world, who produced all things out of nothing through His own Word, first of all sent forth; that this Word is called His Son, and, under the name of God, was seen in diverse manners by the patriarchs, heard at all times in the prophets, at last brought down by the Spirit and Power of the Father into the Virgin Mary, was made flesh in her womb, and, being born of her, went forth as Jesus Christ; thenceforth He preached the new law and the new promise of the kingdom of heaven, worked miracles; having been crucified, He rose again the third day; (then) having ascended into the heavens, He sat at the right hand of the Father; sent instead of Himself the Power of the Holy Ghost to lead such as believe; will come with glory to take the saints to the enjoyment of everlasting life and of the heavenly promises, and to condemn the wicked to everlasting fire, after the resurrection of both these classes shall have happened, together with the restoration of their flesh. This rule, as it will be proved, was taught by Christ, and raises among ourselves no other questions than those which heresies introduce, and which make men heretics. (Prescription Against Heretics 13)
Tertullian sees heretics as ravenous wolves "lurking within to waste the flock of Christ" (Prescription Against Heretics 4). They pervert the Scriptures by interpreting them to suit their own purposes (Prescription Against Heretics 17, cf. 4, 38). Their teaching opposes the teaching "handed down from the apostles, the apostles from Christ, and Christ from God" (Prescription Against Heretics 37). While persecution makes martyrs, "heresy only apostates" (Prescription Against Heretics 4). In the face of heresies, which may cause a bishop or deacon to "have fallen from the rule (of faith)," the Christian must remain true to the faith, for "no one is a Christian but he who perseveres even to the end" (Prescription Against Heretics 3).

Christian apologist Justin Martyr engages in a dialogue with Trypho (c. 160), who says, "I believe, however, that many of those who say that they confess Jesus, and are called Christians, eat meats offered to idols, and declare that they are by no means injured in consequence" (Dialogue with Trypho 35). Justin's response highlights the importance of remaining faithful to "the true and pure doctrine of Jesus Christ" in the face of false teachers:
The fact that there are such men confessing themselves to be Christians, and admitting the crucified Jesus to be both Lord and Christ, yet not teaching His doctrines, but those of the spirits of error, causes us who are disciples of the true and pure doctrine of Jesus Christ, to be more faithful and steadfast in the hope announced by Him. For what things He predicted would take place in His name, these we do see being actually accomplished in our sight. For he said, "Many shall come in My name, clothed outwardly in sheep's clothing, but inwardly they are ravening wolves." And, "There shall be schisms and heresies." [1 Corinthians 11:19] And, "Beware of false prophets, who shall come to you clothed outwardly in sheep's clothing, but inwardly they are ravening wolves." And, "Many false Christ's and false apostles shall arise, and shall deceive many of the faithful." There are, therefore, and there were many, my friends, who, coming forward in the name of Jesus, taught both to speak and act impious and blasphemous things; and these are called by us after the name of the men from whom each doctrine and opinion had its origin. (For some in one way, others in another, teach to blaspheme the Maker of all things, and Christ . . . Yet they style themselves Christians. . . .) Some are called Marcians, and some Valentinians, and some Basilidians, and some Saturnilians, and others by other names; each called after the originator of the individual opinion. . . . So that, in consequence of these events, we know that Jesus foreknew what would happen after Him, as well as in consequence of many other events which He foretold would befall those who believed on and confessed Him, the Christ. For all that we suffer, even when killed by friends, He foretold would take place; so that it is manifest no word or act of His can be found fault with. Wherefore we pray for you and for all other men who hate us; in order that you, having repented along with us, may not blaspheme Him who, by His works, by the mighty deeds even now wrought through His name, by the words He taught, by the prophecies announced concerning Him, is the blameless, and in all things irreproachable, Christ Jesus; but, believing on Him, may be saved in His second glorious advent, and may not be condemned to fire by Him. (Dialogue with Trypho 35)
Clement of Alexandria (c. 195) advises against giving into heretical men and their heresies in writing:
He who hopes for everlasting rest knows also that the entrance to it is toilsome "and strait." And let him who has once received the Gospel, even in the very hour in which he has come to the knowledge of salvation, "not turn back, like Lot's wife," as is said; and let him not go back either to his former life, which adheres to the things of sense, or to heresies. . . . He, who has spurned the ecclesiastical tradition, and darted off to the opinions of heretical men, has ceased to be a man of God and to remain faithful to the Lord. (The Stromata, Book 7:16)
Cyprian (c. 251) bids his readers to "use foresight and watching with an anxious heart, both to perceive and to beware of the wiles of the crafty foe, that we, who have put on Christ the wisdom of God the Father, may not seem to be wanting in wisdom in the matter of providing for our salvation" (The Treatises of Cyprian 1:1). He cautions that "it is not persecution alone that is to be feared; nor those things which advance by open attack to overwhelm and cast down the servants of God," for we have an enemy who is to be more feared and guarded against because he secretly creeps in to deceive us under the appearance of peace (The Treatises of Cyprian 1:1). By following the example of the Lord in recognizing and resisting the temptations of the devil, Christians will not be "incautiously turned back into the nets of death," but go on to "possess the immortality that we have received" (The Treatises of Cyprian 1:2). Only by standing fast in learning and doing what Christ commanded does the Christian have security against the onslaughts of the world (The Treatises of Cyprian 1:2). He who does not "must of necessity waver and wander, and, caught away by a spirit of error . . . be blown about; and he will make no advance in his walk towards salvation, because he does not keep the truth of the way of salvation." (The Treatises of Cyprian 1:2)
Cyprian says the devil, when he see his idols forsaken and temples deserted by new believers, devises a fraud under "the Christian name to deceive the incautious" (The Treatises of Cyprian 1:3):
He has invented heresies and schisms, whereby he might subvert the faith, might corrupt the truth, might divide the unity. Those whom he cannot keep in the darkness of the old way, he circumvents and deceives by the error of a new way. He snatches men from the Church itself; and while they seem to themselves to have already approached to the light, and to have escaped the night of the world, he pours over them again, in their unconsciousness, new darkness; so that, although they do not stand firm with the Gospel of Christ, and with the observation and law of Christ, they still call themselves Christians, and, walking in darkness, they think that they have the light, while the adversary is flattering and deceiving, who, according to the apostle's word, transforms himself into an angel of light, and equips his ministers as if they were the ministers of righteousness, who maintain night instead of day, death for salvation, despair under the offer of hope, perfidy under the pretext of faith, antichrist under the name of Christ; so that, while they feign things like the truth, they make void the truth by their subtlety. This happens, beloved brethren, so long as we do not return to the source of truth, as we do not seek the head nor keep the teaching of the heavenly Master. (The Treatises of Cyprian 1:3)
Oropeza states,
In view of Eusebius (c. 260-340), Simon Magus was the author of heresy (cf. Acts 8:9–24), and the devil is to be blamed for bringing the Samaritan magician to Rome and empowering him with deceitful arts which led many astray (Eus. Hist. Eccl. 2.13). The magician was supposedly aided by demons and venerated as a god, and Helen, his companion, was thought to be his first emanation (Just. Apol. 1.26; Adv. Haer. 1.33; cf. Iren Haer. 1.23:1–4). Simon's successor, Menander of Samaria, was considered to be another instrument of the devil; he claimed to save humans from the aeons through magical arts. After baptism, his followers believed themselves to be immortal in the present life. It is stated that those who claim such people as their saviors have fallen away from the true hope (Eus. Hist. Eccl. 3.26). Basilides of Alexandria and Saturninus of Antioch followed Menander's ways. Adherents of the former declared that eating meat sacrificed to idols or renouncing the faith in times of persecution were matters of indifference. Carpocrates is labeled as the first of the Gnostics. His followers allegedly transmitted Simon’s magic in an open manner. Eusebius asserts that the devil’s intention was to entrap many believers and bring them to the abyss of destruction by following these deceivers (Hist. Eccl. 4.7).

Persecutions: perseverance and martyrdom
Oropeza writes:
The Martyrdom of Polycarp is sometimes considered to be the first of the "Acts of the Martyrs." In this document Polycarp is killed for refusing to confess Caesar as Lord and offer incense; he refuses to revile Christ (Mar. Pol. 8ff; similarly, Ign. Rom. 7). Other Christians did not always follow his example. Some fell into idolatry in the face of persecutions.
Stirred by his own experience under the Diocletian (c. 284-305) persecution, Eusebius wrote Collection of Martyrs and emphasized persecution and martyrdom in his History of the Church. He describes Christians who persevered and others who fell away. Polycarp and Germanicus were found to be faithful in the persecution at Smyrna (c. 160), but Quintus threw away his salvation in the sight of the wild beasts (Eus. Hist. Eccl. 4.15). During Marcus Aurelius' reign (c. 161-80), Eusebius affirms that the Christians confessed their faith despite their suffering from abuse, plundering, stoning, and imprisonment. It is recorded that in Gaul some became martyrs, but others who were untrained and unprepared (about 10 in number) proved to be "abortions" (εξετρωσαν), discouraging the zeal of others. A woman named Biblias, who had earlier denied Christ, confessed him and was joined with the martyrs. Certain defectors did likewise, but others continued to blaspheme the Christian faith, having no understanding of the "wedding garment" (i.e., Matthew 22:11ff) and no faith (Hist. Eccl. 5.1).
During the reign of Decius (c. 249-51), the Christians of Alexandria are said to have endured martyrdom, stoning, or having their belongings confiscated for not worshipping at an idol's temple or chanting incantations. But some readily made unholy sacrifices, pretending that they had never been Christians, while others renounced their faith or were tortured until they did (Hist. Eccl. 6.41). In his account of the Diocletian persecution, Eusebius commends the heroic martyrs but is determined to mention nothing about those who made shipwreck of their salvation, believing that such reports would not edify his readers (8.2:3). He recollects Christians who suffered in horrible ways which included their being axed to death or slowly burned, having their eyes gouged out, their limbs severed, or their backs seared with melted lead. Some endured the pain of having reeds driven under their fingernails or unmentionable suffering in their private parts (8.12).
Clement seeks to inspire perseverance in the midst of suffering with these words: "Let us, therefore, work righteousness, that we may be saved to the end. Blessed are they who obey these commandments, even if for a brief space they suffer in this world, and they will gather the imperishable fruit of the resurrection. Let not the godly man, therefore, grieve; if for the present he suffer affliction, blessed is the time that awaits him there; rising up to life again with the fathers he will rejoice for ever without a grief" (2 Clement 19).

Cyprian (c. 250), commands the presbyters and deacons to take care of the poor and "especially those who have stood with unshaken faith and have not forsaken Christ's flock" while in prison (The Epistles of Cyprian 5:2). These "glorious confessors" need to be instructed that
they ought to be humble and modest and peaceable, that they should maintain the honor of their name, so that those who have achieved glory by what they have testified, may achieve glory also by their characters. . . . For there remains more than what is yet seen to be accomplished, since it is written "Praise not any man before his death;" and again, "Be thou faithful unto death, and I will give thee a crown of life." [Revelation 2:10] And the Lord also says, "He that endures to the end, the same shall be saved." [Matthew 10:22]. Let them imitate the Lord, who at the very time of His passion was not more proud, but more humble. (The Epistles of Cyprian 5:2)
Ignatius's letter to the Christians in Rome gives valuable insight into the heart of a Christian who is prepared for martyrdom. Ignatius hopes to see them when he arrives as a prisoner. He fears that the love they have for him will, in some way, save him from certain death (Epistle to the Romans 1-2). Yet, he desires to "obtain grace to cling to my lot without hindrance unto the end" so that he may "attain to God" (Epistle to the Romans 1). He requests prayer for "both inward and outward strength" that he might not "merely be called a Christian, but really found to be one,"—a Christian "deemed faithful" (Epistle to the Romans 3). He says:
I write to the Churches, and impress on them all, that I shall willingly die for God, unless you hinder me. . . . Allow me to become food for the wild beasts, through whose instrumentality it will be granted me to attain to God. I am the wheat of God, and let me be ground by the teeth of the wild beasts, that I may be found the pure bread of Christ. Rather entice the wild beasts, that they may become my tomb, and may leave nothing of my body. . . . Then shall I truly be a disciple of Christ, when the world shall not see so much as my body. Entreat Christ for me, that by these instruments I may be found a sacrifice [to God]. . . . But when I suffer, I shall be the freed-man of Jesus, and shall rise again emancipated in Him. And now, being a prisoner, I learn not to desire anything worldly or vain. . . . And let no one, of things visible or invisible, envy me that I should attain to Jesus Christ. Let fire and the cross; let the crowds of wild beasts; let tearings, breakings, and dislocations of bones; let cutting off of members; let shatterings of the whole body; and let all the dreadful torments of the devil come upon me: only let me attain to Jesus Christ. All the pleasures of the world, and all the kingdoms of this earth, shall profit me nothing. It is better for me to die in behalf of Jesus Christ, than to reign over all the ends of the earth. "For what shall a man be profited, if he gain the whole world, but lose his own soul?" Him I seek, who died for us: Him I desire, who rose again for our sake. This is the gain which is laid up for me. . . . Permit me to be an imitator of the passion of my God. (Epistle to the Romans 4-6)
Tertullian believes that martyrdom is necessary at times in order for soldiers in God's army to obey the command to not worship idols.
If, therefore, it is evident that from the beginning this kind of worship [of idols] has both been forbidden—witness the commands so numerous and weighty—and that it has never been engaged in without punishment following, as examples so numerous and impressive show, and that no offense is counted by God so presumptuous as a trespass of this sort, we ought further to perceive the purport of both the divine threatenings and their fulfillments, which was even then commended not only by the not calling in question, but also by the enduring of martyrdoms, for which certainly He had given occasion by forbidding idolatry. . . . The injunction is given me not to make mention of any other god, not even by speaking—as little by the tongue as by the hand—to fashion a god, and not to worship or in any way show reverence to another than Him only who thus commands me, whom I am both bid fear that I may not be forsaken by Him, and love with my whole being, that I may die for Him. Serving as a soldier under this oath, I am challenged by the enemy. If I surrender to them, I am as they are. In maintaining this oath, I fight furiously in battle, am wounded, hewn in pieces, slain. Who wished this fatal issue to his soldier, but he who sealed him by such an oath? (Scorpiace 4)
In the following chapter Tertullian maintains that "martyrdom is good," especially when the Christian faces the temptation to worship idols, which is forbidden. He goes on to write,
For martyrdom strives against and opposes idolatry. But to strive against and oppose evil cannot be ought but good. . . . For martyrdom contends with idolatry, not from some malice which they share, but from its own kindness; for it delivers from idolatry. Who will not proclaim that to be good which delivers from idolatry?  What else is the opposition between idolatry and martyrdom, than that between life and death? Life will be counted to be martyrdom as much as idolatry to be death. . . . Thus martyrdoms also rage furiously, but for salvation. God also will be at liberty to heal for everlasting life by means of fires and swords, and all that is painful. (Scorpiace 5)
Tertullian has a long discussion on the certainty of persecutions and the reality of death for followers of Christ. Quoting extensively from the teachings of Jesus, Tertullian urges Christians towards faithful endurance in order to obtain final salvation with God.
When setting forth His chief commands, "Blessed are they who are persecuted for righteousness' sake, for theirs is the kingdom of heaven." [Matthew 5:10] The following statement, indeed, applies first to all without restriction, then especially to the apostles themselves: "Blessed shall you be when men shall revile you, and persecute you, and shall say all manner of evil against you, for my sake. Rejoice and be exceeding glad, since very great is your reward in heaven; for so used their fathers to do even to the prophets." [Matthew 5:11–12] So that He likewise foretold their having to be themselves also slain, after the example of the prophets. . . . The rule about enduring persecution also would have had respect to us too, as to disciples by inheritance, and, (as it were,) bushes from the apostolic seed. For even thus again does He address words of guidance to the apostles: "Behold, I send you forth as sheep in the midst of wolves;" [Matthew 10:16] and, "Beware of men, for they will deliver you up to the councils, and they will scourge you in their synagogues; and you shall be brought before governors and kings for my sake, for a testimony against them and the Gentiles," etc. [Matthew 10:17–18] Now when He adds, "But the brother will deliver up the brother to death, and the father the child; and the children shall rise up against their parents, and cause them to be put to death," [Matthew 10:21] He has clearly announced with reference to the others, (that they would be subjected to) this form of unrighteous conduct, which we do not find exemplified in the case of the apostles. For none of them had experience of a father or a brother as a betrayer, which very many of us have. Then He returns to the apostles: "And you shall be hated of all men for my name's sake." How much more shall we, for whom there exists the necessity of being delivered up by parents too! Thus, by allotting this very betrayal, now to the apostles, now to all, He pours out the same destruction upon all the possessors of the name, on whom the name, along with the condition that it be an object of hatred, will rest. But he who will endure on to the end—this man will be saved. By enduring what but persecution—betrayal—death? For to endure to the end is naught else than to suffer the end. And therefore there immediately follows, "The disciple is not above his master, nor the servant above his own lord;" [Matthew 10:24] because, seeing the Master and Lord Himself was steadfast in suffering persecution, betrayal and death, much more will it be the duty of His servants and disciples to bear the same, that they may not seem as if superior to Him, or to have got an immunity from the assaults of unrighteousness, since this itself should be glory enough for them, to be conformed to the sufferings of their Lord and Master; and, preparing them for the endurance of these, He reminds them that they must not fear such persons as kill the body only, but are not able to destroy the soul, but that they must dedicate fear to Him rather who has such power that He can kill both body and soul, and destroy them in hell [Matthew 10:28]. Who, pray, are these slayers of the body only, but the governors and kings aforesaid—men, I suppose? Who is the ruler of the soul also, but God only? Who is this but the threatener of fires hereafter, He without whose will not even one of two sparrows falls to the ground; that is, not even one of the two substances of man, flesh or spirit, because the number of our hairs also has been recorded before Him? Fear not, therefore. When He adds, "You are of more value than many sparrows," He makes promise that we shall not in vain—that is, not without profit—fall to the ground if we choose to be killed by men rather than by God. "Whosoever therefore will confess in me before men, in him will I confess also before my Father who is in heaven; and whosoever shall deny me before men, him will I deny also before my Father who is in heaven." [Matthew 10:32–34] [What] if a Christian is to be stoned . . . burned . . . butchered . . . [or] put an end to by beasts . . . ? He who will endure these assaults to the end, the same shall be saved. . . . For what does He add after finishing with confession and denial? "Think not that I have come to send peace on earth, but a sword,"—undoubtedly on the earth. "For I have come to set a man at variance against his father, and the daughter against her mother, and the mother-in-law against her daughter-in-law. And a man's foes shall be they of his own household." [Matthew 10:34–35] For so is it brought to pass, that the brother delivers up the brother to death, and the father the son: and the children rise up against the parents, and cause them to die. And he who endures to the end let that man be saved. [Matthew 10:22] So that this whole course of procedure characteristic of the Lord's sword, which has been sent not to heaven, but to earth, makes confession also to be there, which by enduring to the end is to issue in the suffering of death. In the same manner, therefore, we maintain that the other announcements too refer to the condition of martyrdom. "He," says Jesus, "who will value his own life also more than me, is not worthy of me," [Luke 14:26] —that is, he who will rather live by denying, than die by confessing, me; and "he who finds his life shall lose it; but he who loses it for my sake shall find it." [Matthew 10:39] Therefore indeed he finds it, who, in winning life, denies; but he who thinks that he wins it by denying, will lose it in hell. On the other hand, he who, through confessing, is killed, will lose it for the present, but is also about to find it unto everlasting life. Who, now, should know better the marrow of the Scriptures than the school of Christ itself?—the persons whom the Lord both chose for Himself as scholars, certainly to be fully instructed in all points, and appointed to us for masters to instruct us in all points. To whom would He have rather made known the veiled import of His own language, than to him to whom He disclosed the likeness of His own glory—to Peter, John, and James, and afterwards to Paul, to whom He granted participation in (the joys of) paradise too, prior to his martyrdom? Or do they also write differently from what they think—teachers using deceit, not truth? Addressing the Christians of Pontus, Peter, at all events, says, "How great indeed is the glory, if you suffer patiently, without being punished as evildoers! For this is a lovely feature, and even hereunto were you called, since Christ also suffered for us, leaving you Himself as an example, that you should follow His own steps." [1 Peter 2:20–21] And again: "Beloved, be not alarmed by the fiery trial which is taking place among you, as though some strange thing happened unto you. For, inasmuch as you are partakers of Christ's sufferings, do you rejoice; that, when His glory shall be revealed, you may be glad also with exceeding joy. If you are reproached for the name of Christ, happy are you; because glory and the Spirit of God rest upon you: if only none of you suffer as a murderer, or as a thief, or as an evil-doer, or as a busybody in other men's matters; yet (if any man suffer) as a Christian, let him not be ashamed, but let him glorify God on this behalf." [1 Peter 4:12–14] John, in fact, exhorts us to lay down our lives even for our brethren, [1 John 3:16] affirming that there is no fear in love: "For perfect love casts out fear, since fear has punishment; and he who fears is not perfect in love." [1 John 4:18] What fear would it be better to understand (as here meant), than that which gives rise to denial? What love does he assert to be perfect, but that which puts fear to flight, and gives courage to confess? What penalty will he appoint as the punishment of fear, but that which he who denies is about to pay, who has to be slain, body and soul, in hell? And if he teaches that we must die for the brethren, how much more for the Lord,—he being sufficiently prepared, by his own Revelation too, for giving such advice! For indeed the Spirit had sent the injunction to the angel of the church in Smyrna: "Behold, the devil shall cast some of you into prison, that you may be tried ten days. Be faithful unto death, and I will give you a crown of life." [Revelation 2:10] Also to the angel of the church in Pergamus (mention was made) of Antipas, [Revelation 2:13] the very faithful martyr, who was slain where Satan dwells. Also to the angel of the church in Philadelphia [Revelation 3:10] (it was signified) that he who had not denied the name of the Lord was delivered from the last trial. Then to every conqueror the Spirit promises now the tree of life, and exemption from the second death; now the hidden manna with the stone of glistening whiteness, and the name unknown (to every man save him that receives it); now power to rule with a rod of iron, and the brightness of the morning star; now the being clothed in white raiment, and not having the name blotted out of the book of life, and being made in the temple of God a pillar with the inscription on it of the name of God and of the Lord, and of the heavenly Jerusalem; now a sitting with the Lord on His throne . . . . Who, pray, are these so blessed conquerors, but martyrs in the strict sense of the word? For indeed theirs are the victories whose also are the fights; theirs, however, are the fights whose also is the blood. But the souls of the martyrs both peacefully rest in the meantime under the altar, [Revelation 6:9] and support their patience by the assured hope of revenge; and, clothed in their robes, wear the dazzling halo of brightness, until others also may fully share in their glory. For yet again a countless throng are revealed, clothed in white and distinguished by palms of victory, celebrating their triumph doubtless over Antichrist, since one of the elders says, "These are they who come out of that great tribulation, and have washed their robes, and made them white in the blood of the Lamb." [Revelation 7:14] For the flesh is the clothing of the soul. The uncleanness, indeed, is washed away by baptism, but the stains are changed into dazzling whiteness by martyrdom. . . . When great Babylon likewise is represented as drunk with the blood of the saints, [Revelation 17:6] doubtless the supplies needful for her drunkenness are furnished by the cups of martyrdoms; and what suffering the fear of martyrdoms will entail, is in like manner shown. For among all the castaways, nay, taking precedence of them all, are the fearful. "But the fearful," says John—and then come the others—"will have their part in the lake of fire and brimstone." [Revelation 21:8] Thus fear, which, as stated in his epistle, love drives out, has punishment. (Scorpiace 9–12)
Readings from the early church fathers such as these led patristic scholar David Bercot to conclude: "Since the early Christians believed that our continued faith and obedience are necessary for salvation, it naturally follows that they believed that a 'saved' person could still end up being lost [through apostasy]."

Primary theological perspectives

There appears to be three primary perspectives on apostasy in Protestantism: Classical or Reformed Calvinism, Moderate Calvinism, Reformed Arminianism.

Classical or reformed Calvinism

According to John Calvin (1509–1564), once the Holy Spirit brings a person to regeneration (i.e., gives them spiritual life) this experience cannot be lost and leads to final salvation with God. In Calvin's theology, God has predestined to regenerate some (the elect) to eternal life and not to regenerate others (the non-elect) which ensures their eternal damnation (Calvin's Institutes 3.21:5; cf. 3.2:15–40, 14.6–9, 18–20, 24.6f.). The elect may fall away from God's grace temporarily, but the truly elect will eventually be restored and not plunge into final apostasy. Calvin believed that "The Lord uses the fear of final apostasy in order to safeguard true believers against it. Only the ones who ignore the threat are in real danger of falling away." Calvin viewed the passages on apostasy found in Hebrews (6:4–6; 10:26–29) as applying to those in the church having a false faith—reprobates (i.e., unbelievers) who have never experienced regeneration. John Jefferson Davis writes:
Even though Calvin believes that regeneration is irreversible . . . he does not conclude that the Christian has any cause for spiritual complacency. Persevering in God's grace requires, on the human side, "severe and arduous effort." . . . The believer needs to continually feed his soul on the preaching of the Word and to grow in faith throughout the whole course of life. Since it is easy for the believer to fall away for a time from the grace of God, there is constant need for "striving and vigilance, if we would persevere in the grace of God." Calvin thus balances his theological certitudes with pastoral warnings. . . . The believer must continually exercise faith and obedience to make "his calling and election sure."
Others in the Reformed tradition followed Calvin's theology on election, regeneration, perseverance, and apostasy: Zacharias Ursinus (1534–1583); William Perkins (1558–1602); John Owen (1616–1683); John Gill (1697–1771); Jonathan Edwards (1703–1758); and George Whitefield (1714–1770). The Reformed confessions such as the Canons of the Synod of Dort (1619) and the Westminster Confession of Faith (1646) also express views parallel with Calvin's theology.

Moderate Calvinism

In his book, Reign of the Servant Kings: A Study of Eternal Security and the Final Significance of Man, Free Grace author Joseph Dillow seeks to chart a middle position between the Reformed Calvinist and Arminian position on apostasy. Dillow accepts "the Reformed position that those who are truly born again can never lose their salvation." But he also accepts the Arminian position that the warning passages concerning apostasy in the New Testament (e.g., Hebrews 6) are directed to genuine Christians, not merely professing Christians who are in reality unbelievers as reformed Calvinists assert. There are real dangers in these warning passages, but contrary to the Arminian view, it "is not [the] loss of salvation but severe divine discipline (physical death or worse) in the present time and loss of reward, and even rebuke, at the judgment seat of Christ." Dillow, like other Free Grace adherents, disagrees with reformed Calvinists and Arminians in holding that saving faith in Christ must continue in order for a person to obtain final salvation with God. The prominent authors for the Moderate Calvinist perspective are: R. T. Kendall; Zane C. Hodges; Charles C. Ryrie; Charles Stanley; Norman L. Geisler; and Tony Evans.

Reformed Arminianism

Reformed Arminianism derives its name from pastor and theologian James Arminius (1560–1609). Right up until his death, Arminius was undecided as to whether a believer could apostasize. However, he did affirm like Calvin that believers must continually exercise faith in order to obtain final salvation with God. After the death of Arminius, the Remonstrants maintained their leader's view that the believer has power through the indwelling presence of the Holy Spirit to be victorious over sin, Satan, and the world, and his uncertainty regarding the possibility of apostasy. This is evidenced in the fifth article drafted by its leaders in 1610. Sometime between 1610, and the official proceeding of the Synod of Dort (1618), the Remonstrants became fully persuaded in their minds that the Scriptures taught that a true believer was capable of apostasizing. They formalized their views in "The Opinion of the Remonstrants" (1618). Points three and four in the fifth article read:

True believers can fall from true faith and can fall into such sins as cannot be consistent with true and justifying faith; not only is it possible for this to happen, but it even happens frequently. True believers are able to fall through their own fault into shameful and atrocious deeds, to persevere and to die in them; and therefore finally to fall and to perish.

Reformed Arminian scholar Robert Picirilli remarks: "Ever since that early period, then, when the issue was being examined again, Arminians have taught that those who are truly saved need to be warned against apostasy as a real and possible danger." Important treatments regarding apostasy have come from the following Arminians: Thomas Olivers (1725–1799); Richard Watson (1781–1833);  Thomas O. Summers (1812–1882); Albert Nash (1812–1900); and William Burt Pope (1822–1903).

Christian denominations that affirm the possibility of apostasy
The following Christian denominations affirm their belief in the possibility of apostasy in either their articles or statements of faith, or by way of a position paper.

 Anabaptist Churches
 Mennonite Church
 Missionary Church
 Eastern Orthodox Churches
 Evangelical Congregational Church
 General Baptists
 General Association of General Baptists
 National Association of Free Will Baptists
 Lutheran Churches
 Lutheran Church–Missouri Synod
 Methodist Churches (Wesleyan-Arminianism)
 Evangelical Wesleyan Church
 The United Methodist Church
 Free Methodist Church
 The Salvation Army
 Church of the Nazarene
 Church of God (Anderson, Indiana)
 Pentecostal Churches
 Assemblies of God
 Quakerism
 Evangelical Friends Church - Eastern Region
 Restorationist Churches
 Churches of Christ
 Roman Catholic Church

Theologians who affirmed the possibility of apostasy

Augustine, Aquinas, and Martin Luther 
Theologians such as Augustine, Aquinas and Luther believed that some people who did not receive a gift of perseverance can lose the grace of baptismal regeneration and justification. 

Augustine (354–430) believed in a specific gift of perseverance given to some baptized Christians. Augustine did not believe that someone can in this life know with infallible certitude that he is in fact among the elect, and that he will finally persevere. Thus, those who didn't receive the gift of perseverance can reject justification and lose baptismal regeneration.

As Augustine, Thomas Aquinas, (1225–1274) held that justified people can finally be lost. Similarly, Martin Luther (1483–1546) believed that salvation or 
regeneration occurred through the waters of baptism. "But," noted the Reformer, "all of us do not remain with our baptism. Many fall away from Christ and become false Christians." In his commentary on 2 Peter 2:22 he writes as follows on apostates in the Church: "Through baptism these people threw out unbelief, had their unclean way of life washed away, and entered into a pure life of faith and love. Now they fall away into unbelief and their own works, and they soil themselves again in filth." 
In his comments on Galatians 5:4, "Ye are fallen from grace," Luther writes, "To fall from grace means to lose the atonement, the forgiveness of sins, the righteousness, liberty, and life which Jesus has merited for us by His death and resurrection. To lose the grace of God means to gain the wrath and judgment of God, death, the bondage of the devil, and everlasting condemnation."

Philip Melanchthon (1497–1560)

Philip Melanchthon (1497–1560) wrote a commentary on Romans in 1540. On this particular passage: "Brothers, we are debtors, not to the flesh, to live according to the flesh. For if you live according to the flesh you will die, but if by the Spirit you put to death the deeds of the body, you will live" (Rom. 8:12-13, ESV), Melanchthon calls this "teaching about the new obedience." Paul gives this teaching so people "born again by faith" "may understand what the obedience in the saints is like, and what is the nature of the sin on account of which they fall from grace and lose faith and the Holy Spirit."  This new obedience "acknowledges God, obeys him, and fights against the impulses of the flesh which carry a person along against the will of God." When Paul says "'If you mortify the actions of the flesh by the Spirit,' he testifies that there are in saints some sinful actions, namely, concupiscence [i.e., strong sexual desire; lust]; various evil desires; . . . being inflamed with desire for revenge; hatred; avarice [i.e., greed]; etc." These sins do not lead to "eternal death" when the saints fight against these sins by faith through Christ their mediator. It is

when those who had been sanctified indulge in and obey such desires, do not fight against them, and are without repentance. Such persons lose faith and the Holy Spirit and are condemned to eternal death unless they return to repentance. Thus when David had become an adulterer, he was without faith and the Holy Spirit, and would have been lost if he had not afterward been restored through repentance. Here belongs what is said in this passage: "If you will live according to the flesh," that is, if you will obey the evil desires, "you will die." The same thought is frequently repeated in Scripture. . . . 1 Cor. 6[:9]: "Do not be deceived; neither the immoral, nor idolaters, ... will inherit the kingdom of God." Gal. 5[:21]: "Those who do such things shall not inherit the kingdom of God." Col. 3[:6]: "On account of which the wrath of God is coming on the disobedient . . ."

Puritan John Goodwin demonstrated that Melanchthon fully supported the possibility of Christians committing apostasy:

"There are two errors . . . of fanatic men, which must briefly be confuted, who conceit that men regenerated cannot lapse” or fall, "and that though they do fall, and this against the light of their conscience, yet they are righteous," or in a state of justification. "This madness is to be condemned, and both instances and sayings from the scriptures of the apostles and prophets are opposed to it. Saul and David pleased God, were righteous, had the Holy Spirit given unto them, yet afterward fell, so that one of them perished utterly; the other returned again to God. There are many sayings" to the same point. And having cited, upon the said account, Matthew 12:43-44; 2 Peter 2:20-21; 1 Corinthians 10:12; Revelation 2:5., he subjoins: "These and the like sayings, being spoken of regenerate men, testify that they may fall, and that in case they fall against their consciences they please not God unless they be converted." Elsewhere thus: "Whereas it hath been said that sins remain in the regenerate, it is necessary that a difference be made; for certain it is that they who rush into sinful practices against conscience do not continue in grace, nor retain faith, righteousness, or the Holy Spirit; neither can faith stand with an evil purpose of heart against conscience." A little after: "But that they fall from grace, and shed faith and the Holy Spirit, and become guilty of the wrath of God and of eternal punishment, who commit sin against conscience, many sayings" in the Scriptures "clearly testify;" to which purpose he cites Galatians  5:19; 1 Corinthians 6:9, etc. . . . Writing upon the those words of the apostle [Paul], 1 Corinthians 10:12, "Let him that thinketh he standeth take heed lest he fall,"—"But that in some who had the beginnings of faith, and afterwards falling, return not, that faith of theirs was true before it was lost" or shaken out, "the sayings of Peter, 2 Peter 2:20, testifieth."

Thomas Helwys (1550–1616)
Thomas Helwys "was an English lawyer and theologian who holds an important place in American, Arminian, and Baptist history." In 1611 Helwys "outlined a declaration of faith that characterized the theology of the General Baptists." Point seven affirms his belief in apostasy: 

Men may fall away from the grace of GOD (Hebrews 12:15) and from the truth, which they have received and acknowledged (Hebrews 10:26) after they have tasted of the heavenly gift, and were made partakers of the HOLY SPIRIT, and have tasted of the good word of GOD, and of the powers of the world to come (Hebrews 6:4, 5). And after they have escaped from the filthiness of the World, may be tangled again therein and overcome (2 Peter 2:20). A righteous man may forsake his righteousness and perish (Ezekiel 18:24, 26). Therefore, let no man presume to think that because he has, or once had grace, therefore he shall always have grace. But let all men have assurance, that if they continue to the end, they will be saved. Let no man then presume; but let all work out their salvation with fear and trembling.

Simon Episcopius (1583–1643)

Simon Episcopius was the leader of the Remonstrants and primary author of "The Opinions of the Remonstrants 1618" and "The Arminian Confession of 1621." In the Confession the Remonstrants were "persuaded that none is to be easily condemned, or blotted out of the register of Christians who holds fast to faith in Christ, and in hope of the good things promised by him, [and who] seek from the heart to obey his commands . . . ." Furthermore,

Even if it is true that those who are adept in the habit of faith and holiness can only with difficulty fall back to their former profaneness and dissoluteness of life (Hebrews 6), yet we believe that it is entirely possible, if not rarely done (Hebrews 6:4; Revelation 2 & 3; 2 Peter 2:18; Ezekiel 18:24; Hebrews 4:1–2; 10:28–29; 10:38–39; 1 Timothy 1:19–20; Romans 11:18) that they fall back little by little and until they completely lack their prior faith and charity. And having abandoned the way of righteousness, they revert to their worldly impurity which they had truly left, returning like pigs to wallowing in the mud and dogs to their vomit, and are again entangled in lusts of the flesh which they had formerly, truly fled. And thus totally and at length also they are finally torn from the grace of God unless they seriously repent in time.

John Goodwin (1594–1665)
John Goodwin was a Puritan who "presented the Arminian position of falling away in Redemption Redeemed (1651)." Goodwins work was primarily dedicated to refuting the Calvinist doctrine of limited atonement, but he digresses from his main topic and spends 300 pages attempting to disprove the Calvinist doctrine of unconditional perseverance.

Thomas Grantham (1634–1692)
Thomas Grantham "was the English General Baptists’ foremost leader in the late seventeenth-century, during which time his Christianismus Primitivus [meaning: 'ancient Christianity'] served as the primary text for General Baptist theology." In it he writes,

That such who are true believers, even branches of Christ the vine, and that in the account of Christ whom he exhorts to abide in him, or such who have Charity out of a pure heart, and of a good conscience, and of faith unfeigned, 1 Timothy 1:5, may nevertheless for want of watchfulness, swerve and turn aside from the same, and become dead branches, cast into the fire, and burned [John 15:6]. But such who add unto their Faith Virtue, and unto Virtue Knowledge, and unto Knowledge Temperance, &c. such shall never fall [2 Peter 1:5–10], for they are kept by the power of God though Faith unto Salvation [1 Peter 1:5].

John Wesley (1703–1791)

John Jefferson Davis writes,

In the treatise "Predestination Calmly Considered" Wesley observed that believers might infer from their own experience of grace that it is impossible to finally fall away. Nevertheless, whatever assurance God might give to particular souls "I find no general promise in holy writ, that none who once believes shall finally fall." Scripture, and not personal experience or inferences drawn from it, states Wesley, must be decisive in the matter. In his treatise "Serious Thoughts on the Perseverance of the Saints" Wesley allows that the apostle Paul—and many believers today—were fully persuaded of their final perseverance.  Nevertheless such an assurance does not prove that every believer will persevere or that every believer enjoys such assurance. Based on his reading of Hebrews 6:4, 6; 10:26–29; 2 Peter 2:20–21 and other NT texts, Wesley is persuaded that a true believer can make shipwreck of his faith and perish everlastingly.

Twenty-first century

Poland
, the procedure for apostasy in the Catholic Church in Poland is a procedure defined on 19 February 2016. It can only be done in person, by delivering an application to a church parish priest in person. The procedure cannot be done by email, post or state administrative services. Apostasy gained in popularity during the October 2020 Polish protests.

United States
Out of all Americans who identify as unaffiliated including atheists and agnostics, 41% were raised Protestant and 28% were raised Catholic according to the 2014 Pew Religious Landscape survey.

Implications
Michael Fink writes:

Apostasy is certainly a biblical concept, but the implications of the teaching have been hotly debated. The debate has centered on the issue of apostasy and salvation. Based on the concept of God's sovereign grace, some hold that, though true believers may stray, they will never totally fall away. Others affirm that any who fall away were never really saved. Though they may have "believed" for a while, they never experienced regeneration. Still others argue that the biblical warnings against apostasy are real and that believers maintain the freedom, at least potentially, to reject God's salvation.

McKnight says that "apostasy ought not to be used as a continual threat so much as an occasional warning of the disaster that Christians may bring upon themselves if they do not examine themselves. As a warning, apostasy can function as a moral injunction that strengthens commitment to holiness as well as the need to turn in complete trust to God in Christ through his Spirit."  Some argue that the desire for salvation shows one does not have "an evil, unbelieving heart" leading to apostasy.  As Fink puts it, "persons worried about apostasy should recognize that conviction of sin in itself is evidence that one has not fallen away."

Penalties

In old times canon law, apostasy a fide, defined as total repudiation of the Christian faith, was considered as different from a theological standpoint from heresy, but subject to the same penalty of death by fire by decretist jurists. The influential 13th century theologian Hostiensis recognized three types of apostasy. The first was conversion to another faith, which was considered traitorous and could bring confiscation of property or even the death penalty. The second and third, which was punishable by expulsion from home and imprisonment, consisted of breaking major commandments and breaking the vows of religious orders, respectively.

A decretal by Boniface VIII classified apostates together with heretics with respect to the penalties incurred. Although it mentioned only apostate Jews explicitly, it was applied to all apostates, and the Spanish Inquisition used it to persecute both the Marano Jews, who had been converted to Christianity by force, and to the Moriscos who had professed to convert to Christianity from Islam under pressure.

Temporal penalties for Christian apostates have fallen into disuse in the modern era.

See also
 List of former Christians
 Christian atheism
 Backsliding 
 Arminian doctrine of individual apostasy, see Conditional Preservation of the Saints
 Christian heresy
 Conversion to Christianity
 Eternal sin
 Great Apostasy
 Rejection of Jesus
 Religious trauma syndrome
 Julian the Apostate

Apostasy in other religions
 Apostasy in Islam
 Apostasy in Judaism

Notes and references

Citations

Sources

Further reading

 Atwood, Craig D., Hill, Samuel S., and Mead, Frank S. Handbook of Denominations in the United States, 12th Edition (Nashville: Abingdon Press, 2005).
 Bercot, David W, editor. A Dictionary of Early Christian Beliefs: A Reference Guide to More Than 700 Topics Discussed by the Early Church Fathers (Peabody: Hendrickson Publishers, 1998).
 Bercot, David W. Will the Real Heretics Please Stand Up: A New Look at Today's Evangelical Church in the Light of Early Christianity (Amberson: Scroll Publishing Company, 1989).
 Bromiley, Geoffrey W, general editor. International Standard Bible Encyclopedia (Grand Rapids: Williams B. Eerdmans Publishing Company, 1979).
 Brown, Colin, editor, The New International Dictionary of New Testament Theology, 3 Volumes (Grand Rapids: Regency Reference Library/Zondervan, 1975–1978).
 Davis, John Jefferson. "The Perseverance of the Saints: A History of the Doctrine," Journal of the Evangelical Theological Society 34:2 (June 1991), 213–228.
 Draper, Charles W., Brand, Chad, England, Archie, editors. Holman Illustrated Bible Dictionary (Nashville: Holman Bible Publishers, 2003).
 Early, Joe Jr. The Life and Writings of Thomas Helwys (Macon: Mercer University Press, 2009).
 Ellis, Mark A. translator and editor, The Arminian Confession of 1621 (Eugene: Pickwick Publications, 2005).
 Elwell, Walter A. and Comfort, Philip W. editors, Tyndale Bible Dictionary (Wheaton: Tyndale House Publishers, 2001).
 Gilbrant, Thoralf, and Ralph W. Harris, eds. The Complete Biblical Library: New Testament, 16 Volumes (Springfield: The Complete Biblical Library, 1986–1991).
 Leeuwen, Van Marius Th., Stanglin, Keith D. and Tolsma, Marijke, editors. Arminius, Arminianism, and Europe: Jacobus Arminius (1559/60-1609) (London: Brill, 2009).
 Luther, Martin. Commentary on the Epistle to the Galatians (1535), translated by Theodore Graebner (Grand Rapids: Zondervan Publishing House, 1949). Obtained from Project Wittenberg at Galatians Commentary (5:1-13) - Martin Luther
 Marshall, I. Howard. Kept by the Power of God: A Study of Perseverance and Falling Away (Minneapolis: Bethany Fellowship, Inc., 1969).
 Martin, Ralph P. and Davids, Peter H., editors, Dictionary of the Later New Testament and its Developments, (Downers Grove: InterVarsity Press, 1997).
 McKnight, Scot. "The Warning Passages of Hebrews: A Formal Analysis and Theological  Conclusions," Trinity Journal 13:1 (1992): 21–59.
 Melanchthon, Philip. Annotations on the First Epistle to the Corinthians, translated by John Patrick Donnelly (Milwaukee: Marquette University Press, 1995).
 Muller, Richard A. Dictionary of Greek and Latin Theological Terms: Drawn Principally from Protestant Scholastic Theology (Grand Rapids: Baker Book House, 1985).
 Oropeza, B. J. Paul and Apostasy: Eschatology, Perseverance, and Falling Away in the Corinthian Congregation (Tübingen: Mohr Siebeck, 2000).
 Oropeza, B. J. Apostasy in the New Testament Communities (3 Vols. Eugene: Cascade, 2011-2012).
 Pfürtner, Stephen. Luther and Aquinas on Salvation (New York: Sheed and Ward, 1964).
 Ryken, Leland, Wilhoit, Jim, Longman, Tremper, Duriez, Colin, Penny, Douglas, Reid, Daniel G., editors, Dictionary of Biblical Imagery (Downers Grove: InterVarsity Press, 1998).
 Summers, Thomas O. Systematic Theology: A Complete Body of Wesleyan Arminian Divinity, Consisting of Lectures on the Twenty-Five Articles of Religion (Nashville: Methodist Episcopal Church, South, 1888).
 Vanhoozer, Kevin J. editor, Dictionary of Theological Interpretation of the Bible (Grand Rapids: Baker Book House Company, 2005).

External links
 "Early Christian Writers on Apostasy and Perseverance" by Steve Witzki

Apostasy
Christian hamartiology
Christian terminology
Christianity and other religions
Disengagement from religion
Arminianism
Christian soteriology